Rutgers Female College was chartered in April 1838 under the name Rutgers Female Institute. Its first home was at 262–66 Madison Street on the Lower East Side of New York City, on land lent by William B. Crosby, one of the first incorporators. Isaac Ferris was a co-founder.  The cornerstone of a new building was laid August 29, 1838, and the institute was opened in the spring of 1839. It was the first seminary for the higher education of women in the City of New York. In 1860, it moved uptown to 487–91 Fifth Avenue.

An application for a full collegiate charter was made to the New York State Legislature, and granted April 11, 1867, expressly conferring on Rutgers all rights, powers, and privileges enjoyed by any college or university in the state, except the authority to grant medical or legal diplomas.

By 1870, a branch had been established in Harlem, at the corner of Second Avenue and 124th Street.

The college ceased operations in 1894.

Notable people

Alumni
 Florence Merriam Bailey (1963-1948), ornithologist, birdwatcher, and nature writer
 Mary Helen Peck Crane (1827-1891), activist, writer
 Margaret Winship Eytinge (1832-1916), author
 Florence Carpenter Ives (1854-1900), journalist and editor
 Jennie de la Montagnie Lozier (1841-1915), physician
 Anna Oliver (1840–1892), preacher
 Emma Homan Thayer (1842–1908), botanical artist and author

Others
 Julia Keese Colles (1840–1913), faculty
 Oliver Crane (1822–1896), faculty
 Samuel D. Burchard (1812-1891), president

References

External links
 

Educational institutions established in 1838
1838 establishments in New York (state)
1894 disestablishments in New York (state)
Former women's universities and colleges in the United States
Fifth Avenue
Defunct private universities and colleges in New York (state)